Astroblepus regani is a species of catfish of the family Astroblepidae. It can be found in Ecuador.

Named in honor of ichthyologist Charles Tate Regan (1878-1943), Natural History Museum (London), for his important 1904 monograph on loricariid catfishes.

References

Bibliography
 Eschmeyer, William N., ed. 1998. Catalog of Fishes. Special Publication of the Center for Biodiversity Research and Information, num. 1, vol. 1–3. California Academy of Sciences. San Francisco, California, United States. 2905. .

Astroblepus
Fish described in 1909
Taxa named by Jacques Pellegrin 
Freshwater fish of Ecuador